The topic of this article is the demographics of the Marshall Islands, including population density, ethnicity, health of the populace, economic status, religious affiliations and other aspects of the population.

Historical population figures for the Marshall Islands are unknown. In 1862, the population of the Islands was estimated at 10,000. In 1960, the population of the Islands was approximately 15,000. The 2011 Census counted 53,158 island residents. Over two-thirds of the residents of the Marshall Islands live in the capital city, Majuro, and the secondary urban center, Ebeye (located in Kwajalein Atoll). This figures excludes Marshall Islands natives who have relocated elsewhere; the Compact of Free Association allows them to freely relocate to the United States and obtain work there. Approximately 4,300 Marshall Islands natives relocated to Springdale, Arkansas in the United States; this figure represents the largest population concentration of Marshall Islands natives outside their island home.

Most residents of the Marshall Islands are Marshallese. Marshallese people are of Micronesian origin and are believed to have migrated from Asia to the Marshall Islands several thousand years ago. A minority of Marshallese have some recent Asian ancestry (mainly Japanese). About one-half of the nation's population lives in Majuro and Ebeye. 

The official languages of the Marshall Islands are English and Marshallese. Both languages are widely spoken.

Religion

Major religious groups in the Republic of the Marshall Islands include the United Church of Christ – Congregational in the Marshall Islands, with 51.5% of the population; the Assemblies of God, 24.2%; the Roman Catholic Church, 8.4%; and The Church of Jesus Christ of Latter-day Saints (Mormons), 8.3%.  Also represented are Bukot Nan Jesus (also known as Assembly of God Part Two), 2.2%; Baptist, 1.0%; Seventh-day Adventists, 0.9%; Full Gospel, 0.7%; and the Baháʼí Faith, 0.6%. Persons without any religious affiliation account for a very small percentage of the population. Islam is also present through Ahmadiyya Muslim Community which is based in Majuro, with the first mosque opening in the capital in September 2012.

Health

During the Castle Bravo test of the first deployable thermonuclear bomb, a miscalculation resulted in the explosion being over twice as large as predicted. The nuclear fallout spread eastward onto the inhabited Rongelap and Rongerik Atolls. These islands were not evacuated before the explosion. Many of the Marshall Islands natives have since suffered from radiation burns and radioactive dusting, suffering the similar fates as the Japanese fishermen aboard the Daigo Fukuryū Maru, but have received little, if any, compensation from the federal government.

Vital statistics

Births and deaths

CIA World Factbook demographic statistics 

Source:

Population
77,917 (July 2020 est.)

Age structure
0–14 years: 32.94% (male 13,090/female 12,575)
15–24 years: 19.09% (male 7,568/female 7,308)
25–54 years: 37.35% (male 14,834/female 14,270)
55–64 years: 5.92% (male 2,269/female 2,341)
65 years and over: 4.7% (male 1,805/female 1,857) (2020 est.)

Population growth rate
1.43% (2020 est.)

Birth rate
22.8 births/1,000 population (2020 est.)

Death rate
4.3 deaths/1,000 population (2020 est.)

Net migration rate
-4.5 migrant(s)/1,000 population (2020 est.)

Sex ratio

at birth: 1.05 male(s)/female
0–14 years: 1.04 male(s)/female
15–24 years: 1.04 male(s)/female
25–54 years: 1.04 male(s)/female
55–64 years: 0.97 male(s)/female
65 years and over: 0.97 male(s)/female
Total population: 1.03 male(s)/female (2020 est.)

Infant mortality rate

Total: 17.4 deaths/1,000 live births
Male: 19.7 deaths/1,000 live births
Female: 15.1 deaths/1,000 live births (2020 est.)

Life expectancy at birth

Total population: 74.1 years
Male: 71.8 years
Female: 76.5 years (2020 est.)

Total fertility rate
2.86 children born/woman (2020 est.)

Nationality
Marshallese (singular and plural)
Marshallese (adjective)

Ethnic groups
Marshallese: 92.1%
Mixed Marshallese: 5.9%
 Other: 2% (2006)

Religions
Protestant: 80.5%
United Church: 47%
Assembly of God: 16.2%
Roman Catholic: 8.5%
Bukot nan Jesus: 5.4%
Latter-day Saints: 1.4%
Other Christian: 10.5%
Other: 1.2%
None: 1.1%

Languages
Marshallese (official): 98.2% 
other languages 1.8%

References

 
Society of the Marshall Islands